Richard Macdonald (1919 – 1993) was a British art director. He frequently collaborated with Joseph Losey. He subsequently relocated to Hollywood where he worked on numerous productions.

Biography
Macdonald was born in Yeovil and studied at the West of England College of Art in Bristol from 1937, continuing his education at the Royal College of Art in 1939. He subsequently held teaching posts at Leeds College of Art and at the Camberwell School of Arts and Crafts from 1951 to 1955. Macdonald exhibited his artworks, both in solo shows and in group exhibitions with the London Group, the New English Art Club and at the Royal Academy. From the mid-1950s he was involved in film production and divided his time between London and Los Angeles. The Royal West of England Academy in Bristol holds examples of his paintings.

Selected filmography
 Time Without Pity (1957)
 The Gypsy and the Gentleman (1958)
 The Criminal (1960)
 Eva (1962)
 The Damned (1963)
 The Servant (1963)
 Modesty Blaise (1966)
 Far from the Madding Crowd (1967)
 Secret Ceremony (1968)
 Boom! (1968)
 Bloomfield (1971)
 The Assassination of Trotsky (1972)
 Galileo (1975)
 The Romantic Englishwoman (1975)
 The Day of the Locust (1975)
 Marathon Man (1976)
 Exorcist II (1977)
 F.I.S.T (1978)
 ...And Justice for All. (1979)
 The Rose (1979)
 Altered States (1980)
 Cannery Row (1982)
 Something Wicked This Way Comes (1983)
 Supergirl (1984)
 Electric Dreams (1984)
 Teachers (1984)
 Plenty (1985)
 SpaceCamp (1986)
 Coming to America (1988)
 The Russia House (1990)
 The Addams Family (1991)
 Jennifer Eight (1992)
 The Firm (1993)

References

Bibliography 
 Colin Gardner. Joseph Losey. Manchester University Press, 2004.

External links 
 

1919 births
1993 deaths
20th-century British artists
Alumni of the Royal College of Art
Alumni of the University of the West of England, Bristol
British art directors
People from Yeovil
British emigrants to the United States